Earl of Shannon is a title in the Peerage of Ireland. It was created in 1756 for the prominent Irish politician Henry Boyle, who served as Speaker of the Irish House of Commons and as Chancellor of the Irish Exchequer. The earldom is named after Shannon Park in County Cork.

The first Earl was made Viscount Boyle, of Bandon, and Baron Castle Martyr at the same time, also in the Peerage of Ireland. Lord Shannon was the second son of Henry Boyle, second son of Roger Boyle, 1st Earl of Orrery, third surviving son of Richard Boyle, 1st Earl of Cork. He was succeeded by his son, the second Earl. He served as Master-General of the Ordnance for Ireland and as Vice-Treasurer for Ireland. In 1786 he was created Baron Carleton, of Carleton in the County of York, in the Peerage of Great Britain. This title gave him and the later Earls an automatic seat in the British House of Lords. The third Earl, son of the second, notably served as Lord Lieutenant of County Cork. On his death the titles passed to his son, the fourth Earl, who briefly represented County Cork in the House of Commons.

, the titles are held by the fourth Earl's great-great-great-grandson, the tenth Earl, who succeeded his father in 2013.

The Honourable Sir Algernon Boyle, sixth son of the fifth Earl, was an admiral in the Royal Navy.

The family seat was Castle Martyr (or Castlemartyr) in Castlemartyr, County Cork, which was the ancient seat of the FitzGeralds.

Earls of Shannon (1756)
Henry Boyle, 1st Earl of Shannon (1682–1764)
Richard Boyle, 2nd Earl of Shannon (1728–1807)
Henry Boyle, 3rd Earl of Shannon (1771–1842)
Richard Boyle, 4th Earl of Shannon (1809–1868)
Henry Bentinck Boyle, 5th Earl of Shannon (1833–1890)
Richard Henry Boyle, 6th Earl of Shannon (1860–1906)
Richard Bernard Boyle, 7th Earl of Shannon (1897–1917)
Robert Henry Boyle, 8th Earl of Shannon (1900–1963)
Richard Bentinck Boyle, 9th Earl of Shannon (1924–2013)
Richard Henry John Boyle, 10th Earl of Shannon (born 1960), known as Harry Boyle

Present peer
Richard Henry John Boyle, 10th Earl of Shannon (born 19 January 1960) is the son of the 9th Earl and his wife Susan Margaret Rogers Hogg. Between 1963 and 2013 he was known formally as Viscount Boyle and is also called Harry Boyle.

In 2003, he was living at Edington House, Bridgwater, Somerset. On 9 May 2013 he succeeded as Earl of Shannon, Viscount Boyle, Baron Castle Martyr, and Baron Carleton.

As of 2019, Shannon was unmarried, and the heir presumptive was his second cousin once removed, Robert Francis Boyle (born 1930).

Male-line family tree

Line of succession

 Henry Boyle, 5th Earl of Shannon (1833–1890)
 Richard Boyle, 6th Earl of Shannon (1860–1906)
 Robert Boyle, 8th Earl of Shannon (1900–1963)
 Richard Boyle, 9th Earl of Shannon (1924–2013)
 Richard Boyle, 10th Earl of Shannon (b. 1960)
Hon. Robert Francis Boyle (1863–1922)
Vivien Francis Boyle (1902–1962)
(1). Robert Francis Boyle (b. 1930)
(2). David de Crespigny Boyle (b. 1959)
(3).  Liam Francis Paton Boyle (b. 2001)
(4). Robert Andrew Boyle (b. 1961)
Hon. Edward Spencer Harry Boyle (1870–1937)
Patrick Spencer Boyle (1906–1978)
Michael Patrick Radcliffe Boyle (1934–2011)
(5). Robert Algernon Radcliffe Boyle (b. 1963)
(6). George Patrick Radcliffe Boyle (b. 1998)
(7). Rupert Alexander Boyle (b. 1968)
(8). David Spencer Boyle (b. 1942)
(9). James Patrick Boyle (b. 1983)

See also
Earl of Orrery
Earl of Cork

References

External links

Earldoms in the Peerage of Ireland
Earl
Noble titles created in 1756